Senegalia robynsiana, the whip stick acacia, is a species of plant in the family Fabaceae. It is found only in Namibia.

References

robynsiana
Endemic flora of Namibia
Near threatened plants
Taxonomy articles created by Polbot